is a passenger railway station located in the city of Tamba, Hyōgo Prefecture, Japan, operated by West Japan Railway Company (JR West).<

Lines

Station layout
The station consists of two opposed ground-level side platforms connected to the station building by a footbridge. The station is unattended.

Platforms

Adjacent stations

History
Kaibara Station opened on May 25, 1899. With the privatization of the Japan National Railways (JNR) on April 1, 1987, the station came under the aegis of the West Japan Railway Company.

Passenger statistics
In fiscal 2016, the station was used by an average of 816 passengers daily

Surrounding area
Tamba City Hall Kashiwabara Branch
Hyogo Prefectural Kashiwabara High School
Former Hikami-gun Towns and Villages Association High School 
Kashiwabara Jin'ya Ruins, National Historic Site

See also
List of railway stations in Japan

References

External links

 Station Official Site

Railway stations in Hyōgo Prefecture
Railway stations in Japan opened in 1899
Tamba, Hyōgo